Spider-Man is a pinball machine designed by Steve Ritchie and manufactured by Stern Pinball that was first released in June 2007. The table encompasses all three films in Sam Raimi's Spider-Man trilogy, which in turn were based on the prior comics and television series.

In 2016, the game was remanufactured as part of its "Vault" series of re-releases, this time with all the movie elements of the machine replaced with an Ultimate Spider-Man-based theme.

Game details
The goal of the table is to defeat the villains from all three movies: Green Goblin from Spider-Man, Doctor Octopus from Spider-Man 2, Sandman and Venom from Spider-Man 3. Once the player defeats all four villains, they'll have a chances to experience Battle Royale.

Features
There are detailed, vibrant toys of each of the four villains on the playfield with an associated shot: 
Doctor Octopus' magnet that simulates a "Fusion Malfunction" by holding the ball.
Green Goblin hovering on his glider above Pumpkin Bomb targets.
Venom's ramp that quickly feeds the ball back to the left flipper.
Sandman's whirlwind of targets and a motor three-bank at the center of the playfield; and much amazing multi-ball action.

J. K. Simmons, the actor who played J. Jonah Jameson in the Spider-Man films, also recorded additional lines of custom speech appropriate for the pinball game, such as "Extra ball", "Jackpot", and "Way to go, kid, you won a free game."

Design
This machine is designed by Steve Ritchie and programmed by Lyman Sheats.

Dimensions

Boxed dimensions
H: 56"; W: 31"; D: 31"; .

Unboxed dimensions
H: 75.5"; W: 27"; D: 55"; .

References

External links
Spider-Man (original release) on Stern Pinball's website (archived page) 

  on Stern Pinball's website 
Pinball News overview

Pinball machines based on comics
Pinball machines based on films
Pinball machines based on television series
Stern pinball machines
2007 pinball machines
Spider-Man toys
Spider-Man (2002 film series)
Venom (character) in other media
2016 pinball machines